Figueres is a railway station serving the city of Figueres in Catalonia, Spain. It is on the Barcelona–Cerbère railway and is owned by Adif. The station is served by Rodalies de Catalunya regional line  and Girona commuter rail service line .

The station has nine tracks and three platforms. Movement between platforms is via level crossings and an underground passage which consists of stairs that are not wheelchair accessible. The two main platforms have canopies that partly cover the passenger waiting areas. On the left side of the tracks, facing Portbou, is the main passenger building with two floors. The ground floor has the lobby with ticket offices (both staffed and electronic), customer lounge, kiosk, and a cafeteria.

Opened in 1877, Figueres station has an uncertain future due to the arrival of the high-speed line at a new station called Figueres-Vilafant. Officially called a "provisional station", it is far from the centers of either Figueres or Vilafant. The only car parking available is in an enclosed, paid lot.  The current plan calls for moving all train service for Figueres to this new station and to close the old station, although this has been met with a great deal of opposition.

Rail services

References

External links

 Figueres listing at the Adif website
 Figueres listing at the Rodalies de Catalunya website
 Information and photos of the station at trenscat.cat 

Buildings and structures in Figueres
Railway stations in Catalonia
Railway stations in Spain opened in 1877
Rodalies de Catalunya stations
Transport in Figueres